Izgrev Passage (‘Protok Izgrev’ \'pro-tok 'iz-grev\) is the 2.3 km wide passage separating Rogozen Island, Heywood Island and Pordim Islands from Cornwall Island, Onogur Islands and the northwest coast of Robert Island in the South Shetland Islands.  The area was visited by early 19th century sealers.

The passage is named after the settlements of Izgrev in Northern, Northeastern, Southeastern and Southwestern Bulgaria.

Location
British mapping in 1968 and Bulgarian mapping in 2009.

Maps
 Livingston Island to King George Island.  Scale 1:200000.  Admiralty Nautical Chart 1776.  Taunton: UK Hydrographic Office, 1968.
 L.L. Ivanov. Antarctica: Livingston Island and Greenwich, Robert, Snow and Smith Islands. Scale 1:120000 topographic map. Troyan: Manfred Wörner Foundation, 2009.  (Second edition 2010)
 Antarctic Digital Database (ADD). Scale 1:250000 topographic map of Antarctica. Scientific Committee on Antarctic Research (SCAR). Since 1993, regularly upgraded and updated.
 L.L. Ivanov. Antarctica: Livingston Island and Smith Island. Scale 1:100000 topographic map. Manfred Wörner Foundation, 2017.

References
 Izgrev Passage. SCAR Composite Antarctic Gazetteer.
 Bulgarian Antarctic Gazetteer. Antarctic Place-names Commission. (details in Bulgarian, basic data in English)

External links
 Izgrev Passage. Copernix satellite image

Bodies of water of Robert Island
Bulgaria and the Antarctic
Straits of the South Shetland Islands